Wincle is a village and civil parish in the Cheshire East district of Cheshire, England. It holds parish meetings, rather than parish council meetings.

Wincle has a pub, brewery and school. There are several Listed buildings including St Michael's Church.

See also

Listed buildings in Wincle

Notes and references

External links

Villages in Cheshire
Towns and villages of the Peak District
Civil parishes in Cheshire